Kerstin Emich (born 14 December 1962) is a German former judoka. She competed in the women's extra-lightweight event at the 1992 Summer Olympics.

References

External links
 

1962 births
Living people
German female judoka
Olympic judoka of Germany
Judoka at the 1992 Summer Olympics
People from Rüsselsheim
Sportspeople from Darmstadt (region)
20th-century German women